The Palace of the Nation is the official residence of the President of Tajikistan. It is located on Shirinshoh Shohtemur Street in central Dushanbe. The Presidential Palace is surrounded by Dushanbe Flagpole to the north, Rudaki Park to the east, Independence Monument to the south and Varzob River to the west.

History
The construction of the Palace began in 2000. In early 2006, the Dushanbe Synagogue and the local mikveh (ritual bath), kosher butcher, as well as Jewish schools were demolished by the government without compensation to make room for the new palace. After an international outcry, the government announced a reversal and said that would allow the synagogue to be rebuilt at its current site. However, in the final stages of the palace's construction, the government destroyed the entire synagogue, leaving Tajikistan without a synagogue as it was the only one in the country (this resulted in the majority of Tajik Bukharan Jews having negative views of the Tajik government). 

On the eve of the Shanghai Cooperation Organisation summit in Dushanbe in August 2008, the palace was completed, with the summit events being partially held under the golden dome with 20-meter columns. An image of the palace is imprinted on the back of a 500 Somoni banknote, which is the national currency of Tajikistan. In September 2018, Belarusian President Alexander Lukashenko became the first foreign leader to visit the new wooden halls and rooms in the palace. The Old Presidential Palace (former seat of the Council of Ministers of the Tajik Soviet Socialist Republic), located on Rudaki Avneue, was demolished in 2021.

Gallery

References

External links

Buildings and structures in Dushanbe
Presidential residences
Palaces in Tajikistan